Harris Peak is a peak rising to   south of Mount Weyant in the Asgard Range of Victoria Land, Antarctica. It is located between Mount Hall and Ball Peak, with which this naming is associated. It was named by the New Zealand Geographic Board in 1998 after A.M. "Andy" Harris (who died on Mount Everest with Rob Hall), a guide and New Zealand Antarctic Research Program field leader, 1987–92, including two trips to Marie Byrd Land.

References

Mountains of the Asgard Range
McMurdo Dry Valleys